A water jet used for recreation is generally smaller than a water cannon, but large enough that the water can spray several metres or feet. People can either insert money to pay for a predetermined amount of usage time, or push a button for free to start and stop the water. The water jet can be turned to allow the person to spray the water in different directions, it is also used in agriculture .

Water technology